Diphwys Casson quarry (sometimes known as Diphwys quarry or Diffwys quarry) was a major slate quarry in the town of Blaenau Ffestiniog, Gwynedd, North Wales. It was one of the major users of the Ffestiniog Railway.

History 
To the north east of the town of Blaenau Ffestiniog is the valley of Cenunant y Diphwys. In the 1760s men led by Methusalem Jones, from the long established Cilgwyn quarry near Nantlle started quarrying in this area, which was known for its slate beds. The exact location of this original quarry has been obliterated by subsequent mining activity, but it is likely that it was part of what became Diphwys Casson. In 1800 quarry managers William Turne, Thomas Wright, Hugh Jones and Thomas Asseston Smith were involved with the quarry, and also  William Casson from the Lake District borrowed his name to the lease on the quarry. They substantially expanded the workings. By 1820, underground mining had started. 

The quarry was successful in the period 1820–1880, but it ran into difficulties and production ceased in 1890. Working restarted in 1920, but this lasted only seven years before the quarry was again abandoned.

Diphwys Casson closed in 1955 after almost two centuries of operation.

Transport 
In 1864 the Diffwys Incline was laid, connecting the quarry with the Ffestiniog Railway's  terminus in Blaenau Ffestiniog. This incline operated by Rhiwbach Tramway was also used by the Votty & Bowydd Quarry.

References

Work cited

External links 

History of the quarry

Slate mines in Gwynedd
Ffestiniog Railway